Rosalie Lalonde  (born March 27, 1997) is a Canadian 3.0 point wheelchair basketball player who won a silver medal at the 2015 Parapan American Games in Toronto. In 2016, she was selected as part of the team for the 2016 Summer Paralympics in Rio de Janeiro

Biography
Rosalie Lalonde was born in Montreal, Quebec, on March 27, 1997. From ages 0-18, she lives in Saint-Clet, Quebec. A 3.0 point player, she began playing wheelchair basketball in 2011. Initially a reluctant player, she began playing locally, then for the Quebec provincial junior team, and then for the senior provincial women's team. In 2013, she played for the national side in the U21 3-on-3 women's wheelchair basketball at the  Youth Parapan American Games in Buenos Aires, Argentina, winning silver.

In 2015, she joined the U25 national women's team, which played in the 2015 Women's U25 Wheelchair Basketball World Championship in Beijing, China in June and July 2015, and then made her debut with the senior team for the 2015 Parapan American Games in Toronto,  winning silver.

In May 2016, she won a scholarship to the University of Alabama, where she will play for its Crimson Tide Wheelchair basketball team, and study Human Development and Family Studies. In her first season she won the National College Championship with the Crimson Tide. After a tough loss in the final against UTA in her second year, she took home the title in her junior year 2019. To top it off, in April 2016 her Quebec team, Les Gladiateurs de Laval
won the Canadian Wheelchair Basketball National League (CNWBL) Women's National Championship in Longueuil, Quebec, defeating Edmonton Inferno 60–56. In June 2016, she was named as part of the senior national side for the 2016 Summer Paralympics in Rio de Janeiro. At 19, she was the youngest player on the team.

Awards
 2019 - Collegiate National Champion
2017 - Collegiate National Champion
2016 – Wheelchair Basketball Canada Junior Athlete of the Year  
 2015 – Silver at 2015 Parapan American Games (Toronto, Ontario) 
 2015 – Gold at Canada Games with Team Quebec (Prince George, British Columbia) 
 2013 – Silver place at Youth Parapan American Games in the U21 3-on-3 women's wheelchair basketball (Buenos Aires, Argentina)

References

External links
 
 

1997 births
Canadian women's wheelchair basketball players
Living people
Paralympic wheelchair basketball players of Canada
Sportspeople from Montreal
Wheelchair basketball players at the 2016 Summer Paralympics
Wheelchair basketball players at the 2020 Summer Paralympics